Montenegro competed at the 2012 Summer Olympics in London, from 27 July to 12 August 2012. This was the nation's second appearance at the Summer Olympics.

Montenegrin Olympic Committee sent a total of 34 athletes to the Games, 18 men and 16 women, to compete in 7 sports. Most of them participated in team-based sports, particularly in the men's water polo, and women's handball. Pistol shooter Nikola Šaranović, who competed in his second Olympics for the independent nation, was the oldest member of the team, at age 41. Meanwhile, judoka Srđan Mrvaljević, who was elected as the "best athlete of the year" in 2011 by the Montenegrin Olympic Committee, became the nation's flag bearer at the opening ceremony.

Montenegro left London with its first ever Olympic medal as an independent nation, taking silver by the women's handball team.

Medalists

Athletics

Montenegro qualified one athlete in the men's discus throw, and the other in women's marathon after having achieved the "B" standard.

Men

Women

Boxing

Montenegro qualified one boxer in the men's light heavyweight division by invitation.

Men

Handball

Montenegro qualified a team in the women's tournament.

Women's tournament

Group play

Quarter-final

Semi-final

Final

Final rank

Judo

Montenegro qualified 1 judoka by world ranking in the men's half-heavyweight division.

Sailing

Montenegro qualified 1 boat in the men's Laser class through a tripartite invitation.

Men

M = Medal race; EL = Eliminated – did not advance into the medal race;

Shooting

Montenegro qualified one shooter for the following events.

Men

Water polo

Montenegro qualified a team  in the men's competition through the Men's water polo qualification tournament.
 Men's event – 1 team of 13 players

Men's tournament

Team roster

Group play

 Quarterfinal

 Semifinal

 Bronze medal match

See also
Montenegro at the 2012 Winter Youth Olympics

References

External links

Nations at the 2012 Summer Olympics
2012
2012 in Montenegrin sport